Bhabani Prasad Singha (born 8 August 1953) is a Bangladeshi justice of the High Court Division. He was appointed in 2010.

Early life 
Singha was born on 8 August 1953 in Sylhet, East Bengal, Pakistan.

Career 
Singha joined the district court as an advocate on 3 March 1979.

On 4 April 1983, Singha was appointed a district munsif.

Singha became a district and sessions judge on 24 February 2000.

On 12 December 2010, Singha was appointed to the High Court Division of the Supreme Court. He became a permeant judge of the High Court Division 12 December 2012. He is also the dean of the law department at Premier University.

Singha retired in July 2020.

References

External links 
 Judges' List: High Court Division

Living people
1953 births
Supreme Court of Bangladesh justices
Bangladeshi Hindus
People from Sylhet District